Liushi Township is a township under the administration of Lianhua County, Jiangxi, China. , it has 8 villages and one reclamation farm community under its administration.

References 

Township-level divisions of Jiangxi
Lianhua County